Arhopala acta is a species of butterfly belonging to the lycaenid family described by William Harry Evans in 1957. It is found in Southeast Asia (Sumatra and Peninsular Malaya).

External links
"Arhopala Boisduval, 1832" at Markku Savela's Lepidoptera and Some Other Life Forms. Retrieved June 7, 2017.

Arhopala
Butterflies described in 1957
Butterflies of Asia
Taxa named by William Harry Evans